Evening Post Industries is a privately held American media company, based in Charleston, South Carolina, United States. It has been led by four generations of the Manigault family.

On August 6, 2013, the company changed its name from the Evening Post Publishing Company to Evening Post Industries. In a press release, CEO John Barnwell stated, “The name change better reflects our existing diversified holdings and ongoing acquisition strategy  in beyond media, while keeping the legacy value of Evening Post."

In addition to The Post and Courier of Charleston, the South's oldest daily newspaper, the company owns six other newspapers in South Carolina, including the Aiken Standard. Other holdings include White Oak Forestry Company, and a marketing agency, Clear Night Group.

History 
The Evening Post Publishing Company was formed by rice planter Arthur Manigault in 1896 to acquire The Evening Post, Charleston's then-ailing afternoon newspaper. Manigault's son Robert became publisher in 1924. Two years later, he bought Charleston's morning paper, The News & Courier–the oldest daily newspaper in the South.

The company launched an international syndication arm, Editors Press Service, in 1933.

Robert's brother Edward took over in 1945 after Robert's death; he was in turn succeeded by his son Peter. Peter's son, Pierre, inherited the company upon Peter's death in 2004.

In 2004, the Evening Post Publishing Company sold Editors Press Service to the Universal Press Syndicate, which renamed it Atlantic Syndication.

The company also owned the Buenos Aires Herald in Argentina, Latin America's oldest English language newspaper, until 2007.

On October 29, 2018, Cordillera Communications announced it had entered into a deal with the E. W. Scripps Company for Scripps to purchase all but one TV station, the Tucson, Arizona station, from Cordillera. The deal was expected to close in the first quarter of 2019.

Evening Post Industries Properties

Newspapers

 The Post and Courier - Charleston, South Carolina
 The Georgetown Times - Georgetown, South Carolina
 The Kingstree News - Kingstree, South Carolina
 Aiken Standard - Aiken, South Carolina
 Moultrie News - Mount Pleasant, South Carolina
 Summerville Journal-Scene - Summerville, South Carolina
 The Berkeley Independent - Moncks Corner, South Carolina
 Goose Creek Gazette - Goose Creek, South Carolina
 Waccamaw Times - Pawleys Island, South Carolina
 The Star - North Augusta, South Carolina
 Free Times - Columbia, South Carolina

Formerly owned television stations

Evening Post's broadcasting division was called Cordillera Communications.  The licensees had different names (most of which bear the station call letters, current, former (as in the case of KBZK's owners being KCTZ Communications (former call letters), or parent (repeaters only): KOAA (Sangre de Cristo (Blood of Christ) Communications) does not, however). Cordillera Communications was a holding company headquartered in St. Paul, Minnesota.

On October 29, 2018, it was announced that the E. W. Scripps Company would acquire 15 of the 16 Cordillera stations, with Quincy Media acquiring KVOA due to Scripps already owning KGUN-TV. The sale was approved by the FCC on April 5, 2019. The transaction was completed on May 1.

Stations are arranged alphabetically by state and by city of license.

Notes:
1 Owned by SagamoreHill Broadcasting, Cordillera operated KZTV under an SSA with KRIS.

References

External links
 Evening Post Industries

Newspaper companies of the United States
Companies based in South Carolina
Mass media in Charleston, South Carolina